Mary M. Bethune High School was a public high school located in present-day Norco, Louisiana in St. Charles Parish, Louisiana. It served black students on the east bank of the Mississippi River, from grades 1 through 12. It was in the St. Charles Parish Public School System.

History
Mary M. Bethune High School was an elementary and secondary racially segregated school located in the Diamond Community of Norco, Louisiana that opened in 1952. In 1969, the school was closed with elementary-aged children attending schools directed by court guidelines and high school students were moved to Destrehan High School.

See also
List of former high schools in Louisiana
G.W. Carver High School

References

Defunct high schools in Louisiana
Public high schools in Louisiana
Schools in St. Charles Parish, Louisiana
Historically segregated African-American schools in Louisiana
1952 establishments in Louisiana
Educational institutions established in 1952
1969 disestablishments in Louisiana